Andrei Kunitski (born 2 July 1984 in Grodno) is a Belarusian professional road bicycle racer. Kunitski has won the National Time Trial Championship of Belarus in 2007 and 2008.

Palmarès

2007
 1st  National Time Trial Champion
2008
 1st  National Time Trial Champion
 1st Stage 1 Vuelta Ciclista a Burgos

External links
Profile on Quick Step's Official Website

Living people
1984 births
Belarusian male cyclists
Sportspeople from Grodno